The 2014 Women's Four Nations Cup was the fifth Hockey Four Nations Cup, an international women's field hockey tournament, consisting of a series of test matches. It was held in Germany, from May 15 to 18, 2014, and featured four of the top nations in women's field hockey.

Competition format
The tournament featured the national teams of Australia, England, Japan, and the hosts, Germany, competing in a round-robin format, with each team playing each other once. Three points will be awarded for a win, one for a draw, and none for a loss.

Results

Matches

Statistics

Goalscorers
3 Goals

  Anna Flanagan 
  Jodie Kenny 
  Georgie Parker 
  Alex Danson

2 Goals

  Emily Smith 
  Lydia Haase 
  Kristina Hillmann 
  Lily Owsley

1 Goal

  Edwina Bone 
  Georgia Nanscawen
  Tina Bachmann
  Hannah Gablać
  Maike Stöckel
  Ayaka Nishimura

References

2014
2014 in women's field hockey
field hockey
2014 in Australian women's field hockey
field hockey
field hockey